Pendas may refer to:
Pendas, Iran
Pendas, Malaysia